Kara Elise Rochelle (born March 29, 1983) is an American politician who is a member of the Connecticut House of Representatives from the 104th district in New Haven County. She is the Vice Chair of the Housing Committee, and serves as a member to the Higher Education and Employment Advancement and Commerce Committees.

In her youth, Kara has devoted countless volunteer hours to the Valley United Way Youth Leadership Program and continues to dedicate time to various community service projects including the Derby Elks and the Naugatuck Valley Young Democrats, which she founded to reinvigorate and reform the party by returning it to its working-class roots.

Kara's professional experience and upbringing have given her a strong commitment to helping people who work hard to pay the bills and raise their children. Her father Al Rochelle, a retired line worker at Sikorsky Aircraft, has dedicated nearly 50 years to the volunteer fire service and currently serves as chief. Her late mother, Diane, was a loving parent and small business owner who instilled in her kids, through her daycare, a passion for child development and education.

Rochelle graduated from Fordham University and lives in Ansonia.

Political career

2018 Election
Rochelle was elected in the general election on November 6, 2018, winning 57 percent of the vote over 43 percent of Republican candidate Joseph Jaumann.

2020 Election

Rochelle was re-elected in the general election on November 3, 2020, winning 60 percent of the vote over 40 percent of Republican candidate Myra Rivers.

2022 Election

Rochelle was re-elected in the general election on November 8, 2022, winning 53 percent of the vote over 47 percent of Republican candidate Josh Shuart.

References

Rochelle, Kara
Living people
21st-century American politicians
21st-century American women politicians
Women state legislators in Connecticut
Fordham University alumni
People from Ansonia, Connecticut
1983 births